American Ninja is a 1985 American martial arts action film produced by Menahem Golan and Yoram Globus's Cannon Films. Directed by Sam Firstenberg, who specialized in this genre in the 1980s, the film stars Michael Dudikoff in the title role and is the first installment in the American Ninja franchise, followed by American Ninja 2: The Confrontation (1987). It had a mixed reception, but it was a financial success, and since then, it has been considered a cult film.

Plot
As an alternative to prison, young American Joe Armstrong is conscripted into the U.S. Army by a judge. Joe ends up fighting off the Black Star Order of ninjas while stationed in the Philippines. He saves Patricia Hickock - daughter of Colonel William Hickock, Joe's commanding officer - from a kidnapping attempt. But when the rest of Joe's platoon is wiped out by the Black Star ninjas, Joe's popularity with his fellow GIs takes a nosedive...even as he is targeted for revenge by the Black Star Master who directs the ninja-order.

While they are performing chores on the base, Corporal Curtis Jackson goads Joe into a fight. Jackson proves no match for Joe's ninjitsu expertise, which greatly impresses him and their fellow soldiers. Shortly thereafter, Jackson discovers that Joe is an amnesiac; he remembers very little of his past, other than running with various street gangs and mastering several exotic martial arts. The grateful Patricia organizes a date for herself with Joe. Jackson and another soldier, Charley Madison, sneak Joe off the base. Joe and Patricia are caught during dinner by Sergeant Rinaldo. Rinaldo is in the middle of a meeting with black marketer Victor Ortega, whose payroll the sergeant is on. To get Joe out of the way, Rinaldo leads him to an abandoned warehouse...ostensibly for dropping off supplies. There Joe is ambushed by ninjas but defeats all of them. Then Joe's truck is stolen, and he gives chase using a motorcycle. The truck driver runs Joe off the road; thinking Joe dead, he brings the truck to Ortega.

Joe, however, hides under the truck. He is brought to the heart of Ortega's operation, which encompasses the Black Star ninja-training camp. Ortega is paying the Black Star Order for weapons stolen from the Army, which he then resells to the highest bidder. Joe is discovered but escapes with the aid of Ortega's servant Shinyuki. Returning to the base, Joe is promptly arrested by military police...under Rinaldo's false accusation that Joe himself is fencing the arms. Jackson realizes that Joe has been set up, but his protests are wasted on Rinaldo. The Black Star Master infiltrates the base that night and slaughters the on-duty MPs. He then tries to kill Joe, but is thwarted by the sudden arrival of MP reinforcements...none of whom see the Black Star Master fleeing the scene. One of the dead MPs is found with a throwing star lodged in his head, further implicating Joe.

Only Jackson, Charlie, and Patricia believe that Joe is innocent of the charges he now faces. They tell Hickock everything they know about the hijacking and murders, but he scoffs at their story. After briskly dismissing them, Colonel Hickock meets Rinaldo privately...revealing that the colonel himself is Ortega's accomplice. Even as Hickock orders Rinaldo to finish off Joe, the Black Star Master kidnaps Patricia...since her father is becoming a less-than-reliable partner. Rinaldo attempts to run Joe off the road, only to be killed himself.

Joe returns to Ortega's mansion, where he is reunited with Shinyuki. It is revealed that Shinyuki, a former Japanese holdout soldier, adopted Joe at birth after the boy's parents died. He trained Joe in the ways of ninjitsu until a bomb blast separated the two; each has believed the other to be dead for years. Now Shinyuki completes Joe's training, and they launch a surprise attack on the Black Star training-camp. Shinyuki sacrifices his life to help Joe defeat the Black Star Master; meanwhile, Hickock leads his own assault on Ortega's villa to rescue his daughter...and to wipe out "loose ends" connecting him with Ortega's weapon-trafficking. Ortega flees by helicopter, with Patricia as his hostage, after gunning down her father. Joe, however, boards Ortega's chopper; he and Patricia jump to safety just before Jackson shoots down the helicopter, killing Ortega.

Cast

 Michael Dudikoff as Private Joe Armstrong
 Steve James as Corporal Curtis Jackson
 Judie Aronson as Patricia Hickock
 Guich Koock as Colonel William T. Hickock
 John Fujioka as Shinyuki
 Don Stewart as Victor Ortega
 John LaMotta as MSG Rinaldo (as John La Motta)
 Tadashi Yamashita as Black Star Ninja
 Phil Brock as Private Charley Madison
 Richard Norton as MP

Production

Casting
Originally the studio wanted Chuck Norris to star. Some sources stated he didn’t want to have to cover up his face. Michael Dudikoff was cast, but had no martial arts experience. He was, however, already very athletic. Fight choreographer Mike Stone, who was an accomplished martial arts expert, assured the producers that he would pick up the moves.

Post-production
The film was initially called American Warrior and was released in UK cinemas under that title, but was changed to American Ninja for all other releases. The trailer (included on the DVD) contains the original title. In Germany, however, the film was released under the title American Fighter.
It was also the first of three films pairing Michael Dudikoff and Steve James, the other two being Avenging Force (1986) and American Ninja 2: The Confrontation (1987).

Reception

Critical response
American Ninja received a mixed reception with critics. On Rotten Tomatoes, the film holds an approval rating of 0% based on 7 reviews, with an average rating of 3.2/10. On Metacritic the film has a weighted average score of 20 out of 100, based on 5 critics, indicating "generally unfavorable reviews".

Other media

Sequels

In popular culture
 Lethal Ninja – 1992 (a semi-official entry from brothers Avi Lerner and Danny Lerner, the producers of American Ninja 2, 3, 4, and directed by American Ninja 4 director of photography Yossi "Joseph" Wein. Released as American Ninja 5: The Nostradamus Syndrome in South Africa.) 
 American Samurai – 1992 (not a sequel, but a similarly themed film from director Sam Firstenberg)

See also
 List of American films of 1985
 List of martial arts films
 List of ninja films

References

External links
 
 
 

American Ninja
1985 martial arts films
1985 films
American martial arts films
American action films
1980s English-language films
Films about amnesia
Films directed by Sam Firstenberg
Golan-Globus films
Ninja films
Films set in the Philippines
Films shot in the Philippines
1985 action films
Japan in non-Japanese culture
Films produced by Menahem Golan
Films produced by Yoram Globus
1980s American films